Jeff Knight may refer to:

 Jeff Knight (musician), American country music artist
 Jeff Knight (politician) (born 1968), American politician